Eugenia singampattiana is a critically endangered species of plant in the family Myrtaceae. It is endemic to the hills around Singampatti and Papanasam in the state of Tamil Nadu in India.

References

External links

Endemic flora of India (region)
singampattiana
Endangered flora of Asia
Taxonomy articles created by Polbot